Zhang Hua (232–7 May 300), courtesy name Maoxian, was a Chinese poet, intellectual, and politician of the Western Jin dynasty and the preceding state of Cao Wei. An accomplished poet, Zhang also authored the Bowuzhi, a compendium of entries about natural wonders and supernatural phenomena. His political career reached its zenith from 291 to 300, when he served as a leading minister during the de facto regency of Empress Jia Nanfeng. Zhang was considered an effective minister and, in conjunction with his colleague Pei Wei, helped ensure a period of relative stability within the Jin court. As the court fell into factional disputes from 299 to 300, Zhang rebuffed the rebellious overtures of the imperial relative Sima Lun and was executed when the latter seized power from the empress.

Background and service under Wei
Zhang Hua's father, Zhang Ping, was a commandery administrator in the Cao Wei state during the Three Kingdoms period. He died when Zhang Hua was still young. Zhang Hua's family became impoverished, and he was a shepherd when he was young. The official Liu Fang was so impressed with Zhang Hua that he arranged for Zhang Hua to marry his daughter.

Zhang Hua became known for his literary talent, and he wrote a collection of poems, ostensibly about birds – but in fact about people's tendencies. His poems received great renown, and the commandery administrator recommended him to the regent, Sima Zhao. Sima Zhao made him one of his secretaries, and he distinguished himself in that role. However, as an Academician in the Ministry of Ceremonies, he suffered disgrace when he was dismissed for negligence after one of the beams in the imperial ancestral temple broke.

Service under the Jin dynasty
In 265, after Sima Zhao's son, Sima Yan (Emperor Wu) usurped the throne from the last Cao Wei emperor Cao Huan and established the Jin dynasty (266–420), he appointed Zhang Hua as a Gentleman of the Yellow Gate and awarded him the title of a Secondary Marquis. He was promoted to the position of a Master of Writing later. Around 279 or 280, when the general Yang Hu encouraged Emperor Wu to conquer the Jin dynasty's rival state Eastern Wu, most officials strongly objected but Zhang Hua agreed with Yang Hu and became heavily involved in the strategies and logistic arrangements behind the campaign against Eastern Wu. After the Jin dynasty conquered Eastern Wu in 280, Emperor Wu enfeoffed Zhang Hua as the Marquis of Guangwu to honour him for his contributions.

Zhang Hua soon fell out of favour with Emperor Wu. When Emperor Wu once asked him who could be a regent for his son Sima Zhong (later Emperor Hui), Zhang Hua recommended Emperor Wu's brother, Sima You (the Prince of Qi). Although Sima You was clearly capable of fulfilling that role, Emperor Wu was angry with Zhang Hua because he feared that Sima You might usurp the throne from Sima Zhong in the future since he had much support from the masses. The officials who previously opposed the campaign against Eastern Wu seized this opportunity to speak ill of Zhang Hua in front of Emperor Wu and cause him to fall out of the emperor's favour. Emperor Wu then sent Zhang Hua away to the northern frontier in You Province to serve as Colonel Who Protects the Wuhuan and General Who Stabilises the North. Zhang Hua performed well in office as he pacified the various non-Han Chinese peoples, such as the Wuhuan and Xianbei tribes, in the region. Although Emperor Wu considered summoning Zhang Hua back to the imperial capital Luoyang to serve in ministerial positions, he changed his mind every time after listening to officials who disliked Zhang Hua.

Following Emperor Wu's death in 290, Zhang Hua was summoned back to Luoyang to serve as an Official of Ceremonies, a position without actual power. His role was mainly to teach Sima Yu, the heir apparent of the newly enthroned Sima Zhong (Emperor Hui). After Empress Jia Nanfeng overthrew Empress Dowager Yang and her father Yang Jun in a coup d'état, she entrusted Zhang Hua with greater responsibilities as Right Household Counsellor, Palace Attendant and Supervisor of the Palace Writers. In 296, Zhang Hua was promoted to Minister of Works. Over the subsequent years, with Empress Jia Nanfeng in power (Emperor Hui was merely a puppet emperor), Zhang Hua used his political skills to keep the various competing factions in check, in conjunction with Empress Jia's cousin Pei Wei.

Death
In 299, the political firestorm became too big for Zhang Hua to handle after Empress Jia Nanfeng framed Sima Yu for treason in 299 and had him deposed. In the following year, fearing that Sima Yu would make a comeback, Empress Jia had him murdered. Sima Lun (the Prince of Zhao), a granduncle of Emperor Hui, plotted a coup d'état to remove Empress Jia from power. He tried to persuade Zhang Hua to join him, but Zhang Hua was reluctant to do so. Later that year, after Sima Lun successfully overthrew Empress Jia, he had her several of her supporters and associates (including Zhang Hua) executed along with their families.

Sima Lun then usurped the throne and briefly ruled as emperor before he was overthrown. In 301, Sima You's son, Sima Jiong (the Prince of Qi), then the regent, had Zhang Hua posthumously rehabilitated and restored to his former titles and positions.

Poetry
Zhang Hua's poetry was admired by such people as Ruan Ji and Chen Liu. He was profoundly learned, and when he changed houses it took thirty carts to carry his library. Zhang Hua was the author of the Bowuzhi, a collection of articles on various topics of interest. It appears to have perished during the Song dynasty, and the modern work which passes under that name was probably compiled from extracts found in other books.

Family
Zhang Hua had two sons: Zhang Yi, who served as a Regular Mounted Attendant; Zhang Wei, who served as a Mounted Gentleman. Both of them died together with their father and the rest of their families in 300. Only one of Zhang Hua's grandsons, Zhang Yu, survived the purge. He inherited his grandfather's peerage in 301 after his grandfather was posthumously rehabilitated.

See also

 Lists of people of the Three Kingdoms

References

 Chen, Shou (3rd century). Records of the Three Kingdoms (Sanguozhi).
 
 Fang, Xuanling (ed.) (648). Book of Jin (Jin Shu).
 Pei, Songzhi (5th century). Annotations to Records of the Three Kingdoms (Sanguozhi zhu).

232 births
300 deaths
3rd-century Chinese poets
3rd-century executions
Cao Wei poets
Cao Wei politicians
Chinese chancellors
Executed Jin dynasty (266–420) people
Executed people from Hebei
Jin dynasty (266–420) poets
People executed by the Jin dynasty (266–420) by decapitation
People from Langfang
Poets from Hebei